Yehudit Ravitz (born December 29, 1956) is an Israeli singer-songwriter, multidisciplinary artist, composer and music producer. She is one of the most successful and famous Israeli rock musicians, with a career spanning over forty years.

Music career
Ravitz was born in Beersheba. She was accepted to the Combat Engineering Corps military band by Ehud Manor. While serving in the army, she joined the Israeli rock group "Sheshet".

She performed the song "Forgivenesses", a composition to the song of the Israeli poet Leah Goldberg, at the 1977 Israel Festival Song. Ravitz finished sixth place at the festival, but the song became "Song of The Year" in 1977. As a result of her success, she left Sheshet and began a solo career. That same year, she participated in "A Beautiful Tropical Country", a tribute concert for Brazilian music, produced by Matti Caspi. In 1978, she joined Gidi Gov, Yoni Rechter and David Broza to record "The 16th Lamb" (written by Yehonatan Geffen). This album of children's music has enjoyed enduring popularity in Israel since.

In 1987, Ravitz released the very successful rock album "Coming from Love". She produced Corinne Allal's 1989 album "Antarctica", which also enjoyed widespread success in Israel. In 1992, she co-produced Israeli contratenor David D'Or's hit song "Yad Anuga" ("Gentle Hand", or "Tender Hand"), which was released as a 12-inch single by Big Beat Records, and reached No. 3 in the most frequently played charts in Great Britain.

In 1994, Ravitz participated in the Jazz concert "Jazz Film and Videotape", with jazz remakes of some of her songs. In 1995, she collaborated with Esther Ofarim on a live performance, later released on DVD, including a duet of "Cinderella Rockafella". In 1997, she released the album "What Kind of Girl".

On July 3, 2008, Ravitz performed her first Caesarea Amphitheatre show in a decade to a sold-out crowd, after participating as a "model musician" in the Israeli reality television show "Kokhav Nolad" ("A Star is Born"). Due to high demand, additional shows were added, with tickets selling out within days. Her most recent album, "Songs from Home", was released in 2010. The album is a tribute to classic Israeli songs.

Personal life
Ravitz is single and lives in Tel-Aviv with her adopted daughter, Ella.

References

External links

1956 births
20th-century Israeli women singers
21st-century Israeli women singers
Israeli lesbian musicians
Living people
Lesbian Jews
Israeli LGBT singers
Israeli LGBT songwriters
Musicians from Beersheba
Jewish rock musicians
Lesbian songwriters
Lesbian singers
20th-century Israeli LGBT people
21st-century Israeli LGBT people